Zacchini is an Italian surname. Notable people with the surname include:

Edmondo Zacchini (1894–1981), American circus performer
Hugo Zacchini (1898–1975), American circus performer
Ildebrando Zacchini (1868–1948), Maltese-born American painter, inventor and travelling circus owner

See also
Zacchini v. Scripps-Howard Broadcasting Co., a United States Supreme Court case

Italian-language surnames